No One Left Behind (NOLB) is a charity and veteran service organization that was founded by a US Army Captain Matt Zeller and his Afghan Interpreter, Janis Shinwary. Other co-founders include 
U.S Army Captain Jason S. Gorey and Brian Steblay. NOLB provides emergency financial aid, employment opportunities, and used vehicles to former Afghan and Iraqi interpreters who resettle in the United States through the Special Immigrant Visas program. Over 50,000 interpreters served with United States forces in Afghanistan and Iraq since the attacks of September 11, 2001. No One Left Behind operates as a nonprofit 501(c)(3) organization. 

Out of 45,000 veteran nonprofits, No One Left Behind is the only national organization solely dedicated to assisting SIVs throughout their application process for resettlement in the United States.

As of March 2021, NOLB has provided direct aid to more than 2,000 SIV families in over 90 cities. The organization has partnered with State Department-funded Volunteer Agencies and the International Refugee Assistance Project (IRAP) to provide support to the SIV community. According to Charity Navigator, NOLB allocates 76 percent of its revenue to program expenses and 25 percent to fundraising and administrative expenses. The Better Business Bureau Wise Giving Alliance accredited NOLB for meeting all 20 of its standards in 2021.

Overview
No One Left Behind advocates for the Special Immigrant Visa. It conducts three major programs in support of Afghan and Iraqi interpreters for the U.S. government, Special Immigrant Visa recipients and their families. First, No One Left Behind conducts advocacy work in support of the SIV program, to include both annual authorizations for new SIVs and efforts to ensure existing visa processing is fair and consistent with Congress' intent. No One Left Behind is nonpartisan and works with administrations and members of Congress of both parties. It also advises federal agencies on how to execute and improve the SIV program. 
 

Second, No One Left Behind provides direct aid to Special Immigrant Visa recipients and their families to fund basic needs like rent, groceries, furniture, and automobiles. Through a partnership with The Change Reaction, it also provides no interest loans. Since 2014, No One Left Behind has provided assistance to over 10,000 Special Immigrant Visa recipients and their family members.

Third, through its network of SIV Ambassadors and staff social workers, No One Left Behind provides community assistance to SIV families when they encounter unique challenges, family emergencies, or have special needs. No One Left Behind also leads efforts to connect, organize and build SIV communities within local areas.                

Former Governor Thomas H. Kean and former Representative Lee H. Hamilton served as chairman and vice chairman, respectively, of the 9/11 Commission. They now serve as the chairs of the congressionally mandated Task Force on Extremism in Fragile States, hosted by the United States Institute of Peace. Former Vice President Mike Pence said the following when he was a Congressman in 2007: "Protecting and assisting those who have helped the United States and coalition forces is a moral obligation of the American people... I think there is nothing more important than the United States of America saying to people in Iraq, or anywhere in the world, ‘If you stand by us, we will stand by you." The Department of State has audited the SIV Program twice over the last 12 years. No One Left Behind worked with State Department Office of Inspector General on their last congressionally mandated report.

The Veterans of Foreign Wars and the American Legion have joined other veteran service organizations in calling on Congress to recognize the contributions of Afghan and Iraqi translators.

The Section 1212 of the FY21 National Defense Authorization Act increased the number of appropriated visas for the Afghan SIV program to 22,620.

As of January 2021, the U.S. Embassy in Kabul resumed processing visas. On February 8, 2021, President Biden signed Executive Order 14013. Section 3 of the E.O. specifically addressed major issues with the SIV Program.

Comparisons to Vietnam 

On February 11, 2020, Dr. Colin Jackson provided the following testimony to the Senate Armed Services Committee:I think if we look to past involvements, one of the greatest stains on American honor at the end of the Vietnam War was our inability or unwillingness to take care of the people who had worked for us... I think we can take care of people who have exposed themselves to enormous personal and familial risk... There are so many of these Afghans who have been stalwart allies. They deserve everything we can do to take care and protect them. Episode 10 of Ken's Burns "The Vietnam War" "The Weight of Memory" discussed the regret U.S. veterans still have for leaving their allies behind.

SIVs in the media 
John Oliver covered the SIV program in an 2014 opening monologue in which he concluded that it was “easier to get off heroin (10 steps) than to get a Special Immigrant Visa (14 steps).”

ESPN SC Featured an NFL player and the bond he formed on the battlefield Before he became a Pittsburgh Steeler, Alejandro Villanueva was an Army Ranger who served three tours of duty in Afghanistan and forged a lasting friendship with his Afghan interpreter.

In 2019 PBS aired the miniseries “The Interpreters” to highlight the plight of U.S. allies.

In 2021 CBS will air the sitcom The United States of Al starting on April 1. It tells the story of a Marine resettling his Afghan translator in Ohio.

History
During an ambush in 2008, Janis Shinwari, an Afghan interpreter for U.S. forces in Afghanistan, saved the life of US Army 1LT Matt Zeller.  After receiving death threats and being targeted by the Taliban for his actions, Shinwari asked Zeller to help him apply to emigrate to the United States through the Special Immigrant Visa program.  After a lengthy approval process, during which Shinwari was exposed to potential retribution in Afghanistan, he resettled in the United States.  Zeller raised $35,000 for Shinwari through a GoFundMe campaign, but Shinwari, wanting to pay it forward, instead asked that they use the funds to found No One Left Behind to help others like him.   In 2020, No One Left Behind attracted the most bipartisan support for the Afghan SIV program in the House of Representatives since No One Left Behind's founding in 2013.  As a result of these efforts, after failing to reauthorize the SIV program in FY2019, Congress authorized 4,000 visas in the FY2020 National Defense Authorization Act (NDAA).  In 2020, No One Left Behind also served 600 SIVs and their families, providing over $400,000 in direct aid.

Board of Directors
As of January 2022, No One Left Behind is led by its board of directors, which includes Chairman Philip Caruso, Vice Chairman Mariah Smith, Treasurer Blake Lindgren, Doug Livermore, Alea Nadeem, Parker Normann, J.D. Dolan, Loren Voss, and Howard Manuel.

References

Organizations established in 2013
Organizations based in Fairfax County, Virginia